"Customer" is a song by American singer Raheem DeVaughn, produced by Carvin & Ivan, is the second single from his album Love Behind the Melody. It is also Raheem's most popular single and highest-charting single on the Billboard Hot 100, peaking at number 76.

Remix
A remix was released on April 21, 2008. It features American singer R. Kelly and was included on the reissue of Love Behind the Melody.

Charts

Weekly charts

Year-end charts

References 

9<refund>=[organization]

2008 singles
2008 songs
Raheem DeVaughn songs
Songs written by R. Kelly
Jive Records singles
Songs written by Ivan Barias
Songs written by Carvin Haggins
Song recordings produced by Carvin & Ivan
Zomba Group of Companies singles